The Edward F. Sharp Residential Ensemble, also known as the Sharp Family Residential Ensemble, is a set of three adjacent historic houses in The Dalles, Oregon, United States. Edward Sharp (1865–1954) was the county surveyor and roadmaster whose work underlies much of the development in The Dalles and Wasco County. As the official surveyor for the Eastern Oregon Land Company, he also conducted important early surveys across large stretches of Oregon and Idaho. He built the houses at 400 and 404 E. 4th Street for himself and his family (1895 and 1905, respectively), and the house at 504 Federal Street for employees (1900). Because the houses remained under common ownership in the Sharp family for many years, they have retained an exceptional level of preservation. The houses on 4th Street are also exceptional local examples of the Queen Anne (400) and Craftsman (404) styles.

The ensemble was added to the National Register of Historic Places in 1991.

See also
National Register of Historic Places listings in Wasco County, Oregon

References

External links

Houses completed in 1895
1895 establishments in Oregon
Houses in The Dalles, Oregon
National Register of Historic Places in Wasco County, Oregon
Houses on the National Register of Historic Places in Oregon
Queen Anne architecture in Oregon
American Craftsman architecture in Oregon